Edward Byrne (February 21, 1966 – February 26, 1988) was a police officer in the New York City Police Department who became well known in the United States after he was murdered in the line of duty.

Byrne's father had also been an NYPD officer. Byrne had joined the NYPD on July 15, 1986, and was stationed in the 103rd Precinct in Jamaica, Queens. Prior to joining the NYPD, Byrne was in the New York City Transit Police.

Murder 
Around 3:30 a.m on February 26, 1988, Byrne was sitting in his marked patrol car on 107th Avenue and Inwood Street in the South Jamaica section of Queens in New York City. He was assigned to keep an eye on the house of the local Guyanese immigrant Arjune, who had repeatedly called the police to report on illegal activities on his street. The house had been previously firebombed on two occasions and the owner repeatedly threatened. Despite the recent violence and an ongoing crime wave overtaking South Queens, Byrne was assigned to the post alone.

As Byrne sat in his car another car pulled up beside him. Two men exited, and one of them knocked on the passenger side window of Byrne's cruiser while a second man crept up on the driver's side and shot Byrne in the head five times with a .38 caliber pistol. Two other men acted as lookouts. Byrne later died at the hospital. He had just turned 22.

The murder prompted nationwide outrage. US President Ronald Reagan personally called the Byrne family to offer condolences. George H. W. Bush carried Byrne's badge with him on his campaign for president in 1988.

The four killers were identified as Philip Copeland, Todd Scott, Scott Cobb, and David McClary. All four were apprehended within a week of the murder and were eventually convicted. Copeland, Scott, and Cobb were convicted after a trial of murder in the second degree and criminal possession of a weapon in the second degree. McClary was convicted later as the shooter in a separate trial of murder in the second degree and criminal possession of a weapon in the second degree. All four were sentenced to 25 years to life by Queens Supreme Court Justice Thomas A. Demakos, who had presided over the trials. Cobb, in a videotaped confession that was played at trial, provided graphic details of the killing, told how the participants had bragged of it afterward in the aftermath, and indicated that the killing had been ordered from jail by the drug dealer Howard "Pappy" Mason, the leader of their gang. Mason was sentenced to life in prison in 1994 for drug racketeering and for ordering Byrne's murder.

Legacy 
In honor of Police Officer Edward Byrne, 91st Avenue was renamed P.O. Edward R. Byrne Avenue.
Police Officer Edward Byrne Park in Queens was dedicated on August 3, 1995.
Junior High School 101 in the Bronx was renamed in his honor.
The Police Athletic League of New York City renamed its Queens Center the Edward R. Byrne  Institute and fills it year-round with quality educational and recreational programs.
The U.S. Department of Justice established the Edward Byrne Memorial Justice Assistance Grant Program, which directs funding to local law enforcement agencies with the primary aim to enhance officer safety via equipment, technology, and training.
The baseball field at his alma mater, Plainedge High School in North Massapequa, New York, is named in his honor.

See also

References 

1966 births
1988 deaths
1988 murders in the United States
Male murder victims
New York City Police Department officers
People murdered by African-American organized crime
Deaths by firearm in Queens, New York
People murdered in New York City